The Albany Progress was an overnight passenger train operated by the Western Australian Government Railways between Perth and Albany via the Eastern and Great Southern lines from May 1961 until December 1978.

History
The Albany Progress commenced operating on 31 May 1961, when the long-standing service between Perth and Albany was relaunched with refurbished rolling stock hauled by X class diesel locomotives. Typically there were three overnight return services a week. In the late 1960s, Albany bound services operated on Sunday, Tuesday and Thursday, returning to Perth on Monday, Wednesday and Friday.

From 7 November 1964, an additional service operated as the Albany Weekender departing Perth on Friday night, returning on Sunday night using the stock from The Midlander. it ceased on 1 August 1975. The Albany Progress last ran from Albany on 1 December 1978, hauled by preserved steam locomotive W947 as far as Elleker. It was the last regular overnight passenger train to run on the WAGR system and was replaced by a road coach service.

The train consisted of passenger sleeping berths and sit-up facilities, as well as wagons for general freight which were often shunted off the train at various towns.

Eight surplus coaches were leased and later sold to the Hotham Valley Railway and still run on the mainline today.

References

External links
State Library of WA Photographs

Albany, Western Australia
Named passenger trains of Western Australia
Night trains of Australia
Railway services introduced in 1961
Railway services discontinued in 1978
1961 establishments in Australia
1978 disestablishments in Australia
Discontinued railway services in Australia